"Kärleken är" (literally "[The] Love Is"; English title: "Eternal Love") is a Swedish-language ballad about love. It finished 10th with 53 points. It was the last Swedish entry in the contest to be sung in Swedish.

Although lyricist Ingela "Pling" Forsman did not comment on the background of the song when it won Melodifestivalen and competed at Eurovision, she has since confirmed that the lyrics indeed were inspired by the aftermath of the death of Diana, Princess of Wales, in a car accident in France in 1997. The chorus in Swedish translates as follows: "An angel flew by on her way to heaven, so free, but she left her smile here on earth – like a warming sun, like heavenly starlight, so that we can contemplate life and its events with a faith; love is..."

Single
The single "Kärleken är" was released on 20 March 1998. It reached #5 on the Swedish Singles Chart.

Track listing
 "Kärleken är" (radio version) – 3:00
 "Kärleken är" (instrumental version) – 3:00

List placings

Svensktoppen 
"Kärleken är" entered the Sveriges Radio radio chart Svensktoppen on 2 May 1998 at #1 and spent a total of six weeks on the listing.

Tracks
"Kärleken är" also featured on Sveriges Radio's hit list Trackslistan. On 11 April 1998 the song entered the list, and spent eight weeks on the chart, peaking at #6 on 16 May 1998.

English
Jill Johnson recorded the song on her 1998 album När hela världen ser på, both in its Swedish and English versions, the latter entitled "Eternal Love" and retaining the theme of the original Swedish lyrics.

Charts

References

1998 singles
Eurovision songs of 1998
Eurovision songs of Sweden
Jill Johnson songs
Melodifestivalen songs of 1998
Songs written by Bobby Ljunggren
Songs inspired by deaths
Songs with lyrics by Ingela Forsman
Swedish-language songs
Pop ballads
Memorials to Diana, Princess of Wales
1990s ballads